Zoë Wanamaker  (born 13 May 1949) is a British actress who has worked extensively with the Royal Shakespeare Company and the National Theatre. Wanamaker was appointed a Commander of the Order of the British Empire in 2001 by Queen Elizabeth II. She has received numerous accolades including a Laurence Olivier Award and nominations for three BAFTA Awards, and four Tony Awards. 

A nine-time Olivier Award nominee, she won for Once in a Lifetime (1979) and Electra (1998). She has also received four Tony Award nominations for her work on Broadway; for Piaf (1981), Loot (1986), Electra (1999), and Awake and Sing! (2006).

She's acted in the films Wilde (1997), Harry Potter and the Philosopher's Stone (2001), and My Week with Marilyn (2011). She was twice nominated for the BAFTA TV Award for Best Actress, for Prime Suspect (1991) and Love Hurts (1992–1994). She portrayed Susan Harper in the sitcom My Family (2000–2011), and appeared in the ITV dramas Agatha Christie's Poirot (2005–2013), Mr Selfridge (2015), and Girlfriends (2018).

Early life and education
Zoë Wanamaker was born in New York City on 13 May 1949, the daughter of Canadian actress and radio performer Charlotte Holland and American actor, film director, and radio producer Sam Wanamaker (born Samuel Wattenmacker). Her father was of Ukrainian-Jewish descent, although she had a secular and non-observant upbringing. The BBC series Who Do You Think You Are?, broadcast on 24 February 2009, revealed that her paternal grandfather Maurice Wanamaker (originally Manus Watmacher) was a tailor from Mykolaiv.

Whilst working in the United Kingdom in 1952, Wanamaker's father found out he had been blacklisted in Hollywood. Her parents therefore decided to remain in the UK. She was educated at the independent King Alfred School in Hampstead and at Sidcot School, a Quaker boarding school in Somerset. Zoe attended Hornsey College of Art for the Pre-Diploma Course before she trained at the Central School of Speech and Drama.

Career

Stage
Wanamaker's career started in the theatre. From 1976 to 1984 she was a member of the Royal Shakespeare Company. She won an Olivier Award for her 1979 performance in Once in a Lifetime and a second for Sophocles' Electra in 1998. In 1985, she played Verdi's wife Giuseppina Strepponi in the original production of After Aida. She appeared on stage playing the part of Beatrice opposite Simon Russell Beale as Benedick in the National Theatre's production of Much Ado About Nothing. She has received Tony Award nominations for her performances in Piaf, Loot, Electra, and Awake and Sing!.

In 1997, Wanamaker was the first person to speak on the stage of the newly completed replica theatre, Shakespeare's Globe, on London's South Bank.  This was in recognition of the role played by her father in founding the new theatre. She subsequently became Honorary President of the Globe.

From May to October 2010, Wanamaker appeared in Arthur Miller's All My Sons as Kate Keller at the Apollo Theatre on Shaftesbury Avenue in London.

Wanamaker appeared in Terence Rattigan's All On Her Own from 24 October 2015 until 13 January 2016 at the Garrick Theatre. The work is a one-woman play that preceded Rattigan's Harlequinade, which she also appeared in, each night as part of a never-before-seen double bill. In 2016 she appeared in the world premiere production of Elegy at the Donmar Warehouse.

She returned to the Broadway stage in the 2023 Sharr White memory play Pictures From Home alongside Nathan Lane and Danny Burstein. The play is adapted from photographer Larry Sultan's photo memoir of the same name.

Screen
Starting in the early 1980s, Wanamaker began performing on screen, most notably in a number of critically acclaimed television productions, such as the BBC Television production Edge of Darkness; she was nominated for a BAFTA Award for her portrayal of the love interest of a suspected serial killer in the first instalment of the Granada series Prime Suspect.

Television series have included Paradise Postponed (as Charlotte Fanner-Titmuuss, 1986) and Love Hurts (1992–94) with Adam Faith. She appeared with Wendy Hiller in The Countess Alice in 1992, playing a rebellious woman searching for the truth about her past in war-torn Germany. She played Clarice, one of the dim-witted twin sisters of Lord Groan in Gormenghast (2000), a BBC television adaptation of Mervyn Peake's trilogy. She played Madam Hooch in the film Harry Potter and the Philosopher's Stone (2001). She did not reprise the role in the rest of the sequels, accusing the producers of underpaying their actors.

Wanamaker portrayed Susan Harper in the BBC situation comedy My Family from 2000 to 2011. She voiced a CGI character named Lady Cassandra in the Doctor Who episode "The End of the World" (2005), and reprised the role (also appearing in the flesh this time) in the episode "New Earth" (2006). Wanamaker lent her voice to the 2008 Xbox 360 game Fable II as the blind Seeress Theresa, who guides the playing character throughout the game. She returned to voice Theresa again in Fable III in 2010, and again in 2012 for Fable: The Journey.

She played Ariadne Oliver in six episodes of Agatha Christie's Poirot. In 2011, she played Paula Strasberg in Simon Curtis' My Week with Marilyn, which depicts the making of the 1957 film The Prince and the Showgirl starring Marilyn Monroe and Laurence Olivier. In 2015, she joined the cast of Mr. Selfridge as Princess Marie, the Russian mother-in-law of Rosalie Selfridge/Bolotoff. In 2021, she played Baghra, Alina Starkov's strict teacher and knowing adviser in Shadow and Bone.

Honours
Wanamaker was appointed a Commander of the Order of the British Empire in the 2001 New Year Honours for services to drama. She also received an honorary Doctorate of Letters from the University of East Anglia on 19 July 2012.

Public advocacy
Wanamaker has been a Patron of the UK charity Tree Aid, since 1997. Tree Aid enables communities in Africa's drylands to fight poverty and become self-reliant, while improving the environment. In 2006 Wanamaker recorded a successful Radio 4 appeal for the charity

She is a patron of Dignity in Dying, the Lymphoedema Support Network, Youth Music Theatre UK and of the Young Actors' Theatre, Islington. She is also one of the Honorary Patrons of the London children's charity Scene & Heard. Wanamaker also supports Survival International's campaign to save the threatened native tribes in Brazil.

In August 2014, Wanamaker was one of 200 public figures who were signatories to a letter to The Guardian expressing their hope that Scotland would vote to remain part of the United Kingdom in September's referendum on that issue.

Wanamaker is one of nine presidents of The Young People's Trust for the Environment.

Personal life
Wanamaker lived for many years with fellow Royal Shakespeare Company actor David Lyon. In November 1994, she married actor/dramatist Gawn Grainger. Wanamaker holds both British and American citizenship,  having become a British citizen in 2000.

Filmography

Film

Television

Video games

Theatre

Awards and nominations
For her stage work, Wanamaker has been nominated four times for the United States' most prestigious theatre award the Tony and nine times for the most prestigious British theatre award the Olivier, winning two.
For her screen work, Wanamaker has received three BAFTA nominations.

Year given is year of ceremony.

 In 2006, Wanamaker and the rest of the cast of Awake and Sing! won a special Drama Desk award for Outstanding Ensemble Performance.

References

External links

Zoë Wanamaker – Downstage Center interview at American Theatre Wing.org
Zoë Wanamaker interviewed by Beth Stevens about Awake and Sing! on Broadway.com

1949 births
Living people
20th-century American actresses
21st-century American actresses
20th-century English actresses
21st-century English actresses
Actresses from London
Actresses from New York City
Alumni of the Royal Central School of Speech and Drama
American film actresses
American emigrants to England
American people of Canadian descent
American people of Ukrainian-Jewish descent
Commanders of the Order of the British Empire
English film actresses
English people of American descent
English people of Canadian descent
English people of Ukrainian-Jewish descent
English stage actresses
English television actresses
English voice actresses
Jewish American actresses
Jewish English actresses
Laurence Olivier Award winners
People educated at King Alfred School, London
People educated at Sidcot School
Naturalised citizens of the United Kingdom
Royal Shakespeare Company members
American expatriates in England